Homosetia is a genus of moths belonging to the family Tineidae.

Species
Homosetia argentinotella (Chambers, 1876)
Homosetia argentistrigella (Chambers, 1873)
Homosetia auricristatella (Chambers, 1873)
Homosetia bifasciella (Chambers, 1876)
Homosetia chrysoadspersella Dietz, 1905
Homosetia costisignella (Clemens, 1863)
Homosetia cristatella (Chambers, 1875)
Homosetia fasciella (Chambers, 1873)
Homosetia fuscocristatella (Chambers, 1873)
Homosetia marginimaculella (Chambers, 1875)
Homosetia miscecristatella (Chambers, 1873)
Homosetia tricingulatella (Clemens, 1863)

References

Tineidae
Tineidae genera